In mathematics, a locally profinite group is a Hausdorff topological group in which every neighborhood of the identity element contains a compact open subgroup. Equivalently, a locally profinite group is a topological group that is Hausdorff, locally compact, and totally disconnected. Moreover, a locally profinite group is compact if and only if it is profinite; this explains the terminology. Basic examples of locally profinite groups are discrete groups and the p-adic Lie groups. Non-examples are real Lie groups, which have the no small subgroup property.

In a locally profinite group, a closed subgroup is locally profinite, and every compact subgroup is contained in an open compact subgroup.

Examples 
Important examples of locally profinite groups come from algebraic number theory. Let F be a non-archimedean local field. More generally, the matrix ring  and the general linear group  are locally profinite. Another example of a locally profinite group is the absolute Weil group of a non-archimedean local field: this is in contrast to the fact that the absolute Galois group of such is profinite (in particular compact).

Representations of a locally profinite group 
Let G be a locally profinite group. Then a group homomorphism  is continuous if and only if it has open kernel. 

We now make a blanket assumption that  is at most countable for all open compact subgroups K.

In general,  is not smooth. Thus, we set  where  is acting through  and set .

The contravariant functor

from the category of smooth representations of G to itself is exact. Moreover, the following are equivalent.
  is admissible.
  is admissible.
 The canonical G-module map  is an isomorphism.
When  is admissible,  is irreducible if and only if  is irreducible. 

The countability assumption at the beginning is really necessary, for there exists a locally profinite group that admits an irreducible smooth representation  such that  is not irreducible.

Hecke algebra of a locally profinite group 

With the multiplicative structure given by

 becomes not necessarily unital associative -algebra. The algebra plays an important role in the study of smooth representations of locally profinite groups. Indeed, one has the following: given a smooth representation  of G, we define a new action on V:

Here, "non-degenerate" means . Then the fact is that the functor is an equivalence.

Notes

References
Corinne Blondel, Basic representation theory of reductive p-adic groups

Topological groups